The Roman Catholic Diocese of Hengzhou/Hengchow/Hengyang is a diocese located in the city of Hengyang (Hunan) in the Ecclesiastical province of Changsha in China.

History
 July 23, 1930: Established as Apostolic Vicariate of Hengzhou 衡州 from the Apostolic Vicariate of Changsha 長沙
 April 11, 1946: Promoted as Diocese of Hengzhou 衡州

Leadership
 Bishops of Hengzhou (Roman rite)
 Bishop Joseph Wan Ci-zhang, O.F.M. (萬次章) (February 14, 1952 – March 1961)
 Bishop Raffaele Angelo Palazzi, O.F.M. (April 11, 1946 – February 1, 1951)
 Vicars Apostolic of Hengzhou 衡州 (Roman Rite)
 Bishop Raffaele Angelo Palazzi, O.F.M. (July 23, 1930 – April 11, 1946)

References

 GCatholic.org
 Catholic Hierarchy

Roman Catholic dioceses in China
Christian organizations established in 1930
Roman Catholic dioceses and prelatures established in the 20th century
Christianity in Hunan
Hengyang